Hans Schedler (born 12 June 1904, date of death unknown) was a German wrestler. He competed in the men's freestyle middleweight at the 1936 Summer Olympics.

References

External links
 

1904 births
Year of death missing
German male sport wrestlers
Olympic wrestlers of Germany
Wrestlers at the 1936 Summer Olympics
Place of birth missing